Dan Quick (born December 29, 1957) is an American politician who served in the Nebraska Legislature from the 35th district from 2017 to 2021.

References

1957 births
Living people
Democratic Party Nebraska state senators
21st-century American politicians